Deraldo Wanderley (born 29 April 1956) is a Brazilian volleyball player. He competed in the men's tournament at the 1980 Summer Olympics.

References

External links
 

1956 births
Living people
Brazilian men's volleyball players
Olympic volleyball players of Brazil
Volleyball players at the 1980 Summer Olympics
Sportspeople from São Paulo
Pan American Games medalists in volleyball
Pan American Games silver medalists for Brazil
Medalists at the 1979 Pan American Games